Mah Jabeen Sharan is a Pakistani politician who is member-elect of the Provincial Assembly of Balochistan

Political career
She was elected to the Provincial Assembly of Balochistan as a candidate of Balochistan Awami Party on a reserved seat for women in 2018 Pakistani general election.

References

Living people
Balochistan Awami Party MPAs (Balochistan)
Year of birth missing (living people)